The 1937–38 season was Aberdeen's 33rd season in the top flight of Scottish football and their 34th season competed in the Scottish League Division One and the Scottish Cup.

Results

Division One

Final standings

Scottish Cup

References

AFC Heritage Trust

Aberdeen F.C. seasons
Aber